NWA Hard Times is a professional wrestling pay-per-view event produced by National Wrestling Alliance (NWA). The first event took place on January 24, 2020, and the second event took place on December 4, 2021, making it a recurring annual pay-per-view event.

Dates and venues

References

National Wrestling Alliance pay-per-view events
NWA Hard Times